Cornelius "Con" Denis Murphy (3 September 1908 – 13 July 1964) was a Welsh dual-code international rugby union, and professional rugby league footballer who played in the 1930s and 1940s.

Background
Con Murphy was born in Aberfan, Wales, and he died aged 55 in Leeds, West Riding of Yorkshire, England.

Playing career

International honours
Con Murphy won caps for Wales (RU) while at Cross Keys RFC in 1935 against England, Scotland, and Ireland, and won caps for Wales (RL) while at Leeds 1939…1944 5-caps.

Championship final appearances
Con Murphy played  in Leeds' 2-8 defeat by Hunslet in the Championship Final during the 1937–38 season at Elland Road, Leeds on Saturday 30 April 1938.

Challenge Cup Final appearances
Con Murphy played  in Leeds' 19-2 victory over Halifax in the 1940–41 Challenge Cup Final during the 1940–41 season at Odsal Stadium, Bradford, in front of a crowd of 28,500, and played  in the 15-10 victory over Halifax in the 1941–42 Challenge Cup Final during the 1941–42 season at Odsal Stadium, Bradford, in front of a crowd of 15,250.

County Cup Final appearances
Con Murphy played  in Leeds' 14-8 victory over Huddersfield in the 1937–38 Yorkshire County Cup Final during the 1937–38 season at Belle Vue, Wakefield on Saturday 30 October 1937.

References

External links

1908 births
1964 deaths
Acton and Willesden RLFC players
Cross Keys RFC players
Dual-code rugby internationals
Leeds Rhinos players
People from Aberfan
Rugby league hookers
Rugby league players from Merthyr Tydfil County Borough
Rugby union hookers
Rugby union players from Merthyr Tydfil County Borough
Streatham and Mitcham R.L.F.C. players
Wales international rugby union players
Wales national rugby league team players
Welsh rugby league players
Welsh rugby union players
Yorkshire rugby league team players